I Wanna Dance with Somebody (The Movie: Whitney New, Classic and Reimagined) is the soundtrack album to the biographical film, Whitney Houston: I Wanna Dance with Somebody, based on the life of American pop singer and actress Whitney Houston. The soundtrack was released by RCA Records on December 16, 2022, a week before the film's theatrical release.The album was produced by Rodney Jerkins and Marvin "Tony" Hemmings and executive produced by Clive Davis, who also serves as one of the producers of the film.

Music 
The soundtrack comprises 35 tracks, most of which are by Houston chronicling her career. It also includes reimagined remixes of some of Houston's classics featuring producers such as Sam Feldt, Moto Blanco and P2J and contemporary acts of various genres including Lucky Daye, Oxlade, Pheelz and Samaria. The album also includes unreleased recordings from Houston's vault, including the Michael Masser composed soul ballad "Far Enough", "Moment of Truth" culled from the Whitney album sessions of 1986, and two covers from the Winans family, including "Tomorrow", originally recorded by The Winans and in which Houston is joined by Samaria, and "Don't Cry for Me", which Houston covered from BeBe & CeCe Winans originally at the Commitment to Life AIDS benefit concert for AIDS Project Los Angeles in January 1994. The latter track is featured three times on the album, including a remastered ballad production by Jerkins and an a cappella version. It is Houston's first posthumous soundtrack release since her death in 2012.

Track listing 

Notes
 All of the tracks appeared in the film, with the exceptions of newly remixed songs (excluding "Higher Love", "Don't Cry for Me (Darkchild Film Version)" and "Tomorrow"), and tracks 34 and 35.

Sample credits
 "Honest (Heartbreak Hotel)" contains a sample of "Heartbreak Hotel", sung by Houston, Faith Evans and Kelly Price.
 "Okay (It's Not Right)" contains a sample of "It's Not Right but It's Okay", sung by Houston.
 "Impossible Things" contains a sample of "Impossible/It's Possible", sung by Houston and Brandy.

Charts

References

External links
'I Wanna Dance With Somebody (The Movie: Whitney New, Classic and Reimagined)'

2022 soundtrack albums
Whitney Houston compilation albums
Pop soundtracks
Rhythm and blues soundtracks
RCA Records soundtracks